Manou Schauls (born February 13, 1972) is a previous defender of Luxembourg's football team. He retired in 2005.

International career
He was a member of the Luxembourg national football team from 1997 to 2005.

External links
 

1972 births
Living people
Luxembourgian footballers
Luxembourg international footballers
FC Swift Hesperange players
Jeunesse Esch players
FC Differdange 03 players
Association football defenders